Martin of Gerstmann (1527–1585) was Bishop of Wrocław in the years 1574 to 1585, and governor of Silesia.

Martin Gerstmann was born into a family of Protestant clothier, on March 8, 1527  in Bolesławiec. He studied in Frankfurt an der Oder and Padua, where he earned a doctorate in both Canon and civil law. In Padua he converted to Catholicism. In 1561. He became a canon of the cathedral of Wroclaw, in 1571 and dean in 1558. He was Chancellor of the bishopric of Olomouc, and then tutor the children of the emperor and the secretary of Emperor Maximilian II.

In 1571 he was made a noble and on July 1, 1574AD his Chapter elected him bishop. As bishop he tried to keep a good relationship with Protestants and allow for freedom of religion in the principality. On the other hand, at the Synod in 1580. Adopted the provisions of the Council of Trent. Martin Gerstmann died 23 June 1585AD In Nysa and was buried in the church of St. James in Nysa.

References

1527 births
1585 deaths
People from Bolesławiec
16th-century Roman Catholic bishops in Poland
16th-century Roman Catholic bishops in the Holy Roman Empire
Bishops of Wrocław